The East Jasper School District is a public school district based in Heidelberg, Mississippi (USA).

Schools
Heidelberg High School (Grades 7-12)
William J. Berry Elementary School (Grades K-6)

Demographics

2006-07 school year
There were a total of 1,217 students enrolled in the East Jasper School District during the 2006–2007 school year. The gender makeup of the district was 50% female and 50% male. The racial makeup of the district was 99.67% African American and 0.33% White. 90.3% of the district's students were eligible to receive free lunch.

Previous school years

Accountability statistics

See also
List of school districts in Mississippi

References

External links
East Jasper School District

Education in Jasper County, Mississippi
School districts in Mississippi